İnanlı is a village in the Yüksekova District of Hakkâri Province in Turkey. The village had a population of 2,800 in 2022.

The villagers are sheep herders.

Population 
Population history from 2000 to 2022:

References 

Villages in Yüksekova District
Kurdish settlements in Hakkâri Province